Marko Šimić (born 8 September 1985 in Valjevo) is a Croatian football goalkeeper who last played for Novi Pazar in Serbian SuperLiga.

Club career
After having played in the youth teams of NK Dinamo Zagreb, Marko Šimić later played as senior with NK Croatia Sesvete in the Croatian First League. He was playing with Croatian side NK ZET when, in summer 2010, he moved to Serbia and signed with FK Jagodina. During 2011 he received Serbian citizenship thus not counting as foreigner while in Serbia anymore. His fine performances during the 2011–12 season earned him the title of best goalkeeper of the season.

National team
He has represented Croatia internationally at U15, U17, U18, U19, U20 and U21 level.

Awards

Individual
Serbian SuperLiga Team of the Year: 2011–12

References

External sources
 Marko Šimić Stats at Utakmica.rs
 

1985 births
Living people
Sportspeople from Valjevo
Croats of Serbia
Association football goalkeepers
Serbian footballers
Croatian footballers
Croatia youth international footballers
Croatia under-21 international footballers
Croatian expatriate footballers
NK Croatia Sesvete players
FK Jagodina players
Sanat Naft Abadan F.C. players
FK Radnički 1923 players
FK Novi Pazar players
Croatian Football League players
Serbian SuperLiga players
Persian Gulf Pro League players
Expatriate footballers in Iran
Croatian expatriate sportspeople in Iran